The Cost of Hatred is a 1917 American drama silent film directed by George Melford and written by Beulah Marie Dix. The film stars Kathlyn Williams, Theodore Roberts, Tom Forman, Jack W. Johnston, Jack Holt and Charles Ogle. The film was released on April 9, 1917, by Paramount Pictures.

Plot
Advertised as a story about a man's consuming desire for revenge.

Cast 
Kathlyn Williams as Elsie Graves / Sarita Graves
Theodore Roberts as Justus Graves
Tom Forman as Ned Amory
Jack W. Johnston as Robert Amory (*aka J. W. Johnston)
Jack Holt as Huertez
Charles Ogle as McCabe (*Charles Stanton Ogle)
Walter Long as Jefe Politico
Horace B. Carpenter as Ramon
Mayme Kelso as Elsie's Companion
Louise Mineugh as Little Sarita
Lucien Littlefield	
Lillian Rosine

References

External links 
 

1917 films
1910s English-language films
Silent American drama films
1917 drama films
Paramount Pictures films
Films directed by George Melford
American black-and-white films
American silent feature films
1910s American films